Sporormiella is a genus of fungi in the family Sporormiaceae. Species of the genus are obligately coprophilous, occurring on the dung of domestic livestock as well as wild herbivores. The genus is distributed across boreal and temperate regions of the world, and contains about 80 species. The spores have characteristic features–they are dark brown, septate and have a pronounced sigmoid germination pore, which enables their use in paleoecology as a proxy or indicator for the abundance of grazing mammals.

References

Pleosporales
Coprophagous organisms
Dothideomycetes genera